List of British super-featherweight boxing champions is a table showing the boxers who have won the British super-featherweight title. A junior-lightweight title was sanctioned by the British Boxing Board of Control (BBBoC) from 1968 to 1969. A title at the weight was reintroduced in 1986, now renamed the super-featherweight title.

A champion may retire or voluntarily relinquish the title in order to fight for a higher-ranked championship. Where the date on which a champion relinquished the title is unclear, the date of the last BBBoC sanctioned fight is shown.

r–Champion relinquished title.

s–Champion stripped of title.

See also
 List of British heavyweight boxing champions
 List of British cruiserweight boxing champions
 List of British light-heavyweight boxing champions
 List of British super-middleweight boxing champions
 List of British middleweight boxing champions
 List of British light-middleweight boxing champions
 List of British welterweight boxing champions
 List of British light-welterweight boxing champions
 List of British lightweight boxing champions
 List of British featherweight boxing champions
 List of British super-bantamweight boxing champions
 List of British bantamweight boxing champions
 List of British super-flyweight boxing champions
 List of British flyweight boxing champions
 List of British world boxing champions

Sources
boxrec

Super